The Siebel Si 204 was a small twin-engined transport and trainer aircraft developed in World War II. It was based on the Fh 104 Hallore. Originally designed in response to an Ministry of Aviation development order for a small civil transport aircraft in 1938, it was eventually produced for the Luftwaffe.

Development and production

 
The Si 204 was planned as a small all-metal passenger aircraft with two crew and eight passengers for German airline Deutsche Luft Hansa (DLH). Development was initiated in 1938. The contractor was, as usual, the RLM, but the development was conducted in close collaboration between DLH and Siebel in Halle.

After the beginning of the war, the aircraft was redesigned as a trainer aircraft with a full "stepless" glass cockpit, as had been initiated with the He 111P in early 1938, with no separate flat windscreen for the pilot (much as almost all German bomber aircraft of the time were being designed), which seemed to be better for blind flying in the Si 204's case.

The first two prototypes only were delivered as passenger aircraft with the old cockpit. The maiden flight of the first prototype was before September 1940, possibly on 25 May 1940, that of the second prototype before February 1941. The third prototype was redesigned as a trainer aircraft for blind flying. As a result of this, the maiden flight was not earlier than the end of 1941 or the beginning of 1942.

At that time, Siebel produced the Junkers Ju 88 under licence, so only 15 prototypes were able to be built in Halle. As a result, Société Nationale de Constructions Aéronautiques du Nord  (SNCAN) in France produced the A-0 preseries A-1 production passenger aircraft between April 1942 and November 1943.

Českomoravská Kolben-Daněk (ČKD, called Böhmisch-Mährische Maschinenfabrik AG [BMM] in German) in the Protectorate of Bohemia and Moravia delivered the first blind flying trainer D-0 in January 1943 followed by production of a further 44 D-0 preseries aircraft. The D-1 series was begun in March 1943 by Aero, also in the Protectorate, and by BMM in June or July 1943. In August 1943, SNCAN also delivered their first D-1.

Production of the D-3 was started in October 1944 by Aero Vodochody. The D-3 had wooden wings and a tail-plane made of wood and metal. French production of the D-1 was ended in August 1944 after the Liberation. SNCAN produced a total of 168 units of the Si 204. BMM produced the aircraft until October 1944 and then changed to producing spare parts for the Si 204. The Aero company was scheduled to cease production of the D-1 in March 1945 after building 486 aircraft and then switch to D-3 only. The aircraft, however, was only built until January 1945 with 541 completed.

Therefore, total production was 1,216 (until January 1945) including the prototypes; some production in other countries continued after the war ended.

Operational history

The Si 204D was used mainly in B- and C-Schools (advanced schools) and in FÜG 1 (delivery wing of the Luftwaffe), probably as a taxi aircraft for crews who had delivered other aircraft to fighting units. Its use in blind flying schools was sporadic; for radio schools, no evidence of use has been found. The Si 204A flew mainly with communications squadrons and flying services for senior officers, but also with schools.

In July 1944, five Si 204 were destined to be converted to night-combat aircraft, but no further aircraft were allotted. They were probably intended for the pre-series Si 204 E-0. However, no evidence shows that these aircraft were ever used in combat situations.

Luft Hansa received at least four Si 204s: The first prototype, D-AEFR, was evaluated from March to May 1941 by Luft Hansa Prague. From spring 1942 to spring 1943, the second prototype, D-ASGU, was used on regular routes as a freight carrier.

An Si 204 was likely the last German aircraft shot down on the Western Front. At 8 pm on May 8, 1945, 2nd Lt. K. L. Smith of the 9th Air Force's 474th Fighter Group, flying a P-38 Lightning, downed a Siebel 3 miles southeast of Rodach, Bavaria.

At the end of the war, one Si 204D remained in Berlin-Tempelhof (named "Rhein"). One flew to Enns in Austria, where it was captured by the Allies.

Captured Si 204s flew in a variety of civil roles in the post-war USSR, serving with Aeroflot until 1949, being particularly successful in Tajikistan regional services. Soviet Polar Aviation flew seven Si 204s, equipped with skis, in Siberia. Major engine deficiencies in the extreme climate conditions, with four aircraft lost, caused local aircrew to nickname the Si 204 Giebel, Russian for disaster, before withdrawal from the region. The last Soviet Si 204, flying with the Agricultural Survey, was retired in 1951.

Prototypes

Variants
Si 204 Prototypes each given a separate V number; Fifteen built by Siebel at Halle.
Si 204A Pre-production A-0 and initial production A-1 passenger transports built at SNCAN (Société Nationale de Constructions Aéronautiques du Nord) in France.
Si 204D A blind flying trainer developed by ČKD (BMM) in the Protectorate of Bohemia and Moravia; the first D-0 pre-series aircraft was delivered in January 1943 plus another 44. Production of the D-1 was carried out by Aero and BMM. D-3 aircraft were built with wooden wings and tailplanes in an effort to relieve pressure on the Aluminium supply.
Aero C-3Postwar production in Czechoslovakia for flying (C-3A) and crew training (C-3B).
Aero C-103 Civilian passenger transport variant.
Aero D-44military transport variant.
SNCAC NC.701 MartinetMilitary transport powered by two SNECMA 12S-00 inverted air-cooled V-12 engines.
SNCAC NC.702 MartinetPassenger transport version with stepped windscreen.

Production figures of the Si 204 until 31 January 1945:

Sources: Files from Federal Archive/Military Archive Freiburg and from Lufthansa-Archive, Cologne

After the war, a production of Si 204 continued in Czechoslovakia and France. In Czechoslovakia Aero Vodochody produced 179 Si 204D, developed into military trainer variants Aero C-3A and C-3B (the latter for bombardier training), passenger variant C-103 and military transport variant Aero D-44 until 1949. In France SNCAC (Société Nationale de Constructions Aéronautiques du Centre), commonly known as Aérocentre, produced 240 transport NC.701 Martinets and a number (110?) of passenger NC.702 Martinets. The NC.701 was distinguished by three-blade propellers and was powered by 440 kW (590 hp) Renault 12S-00 engines. The NC.702 had a modified nose.

Operators

Military operators

 Czechoslovakian Air Force operated ex-Luftwaffe Si 204 as well as Aero C-3 built in Czechoslovakia post war.
 Czechoslovakian National Security Guard

 French Air Force operated ex-Luftwaffe Si 204 as well as NC.701 built in France post war.
 French Navy

 Luftwaffe

 Hungarian Air Force operated six Aero C-3s from 1947 to 1953.

 Polish Air Force operated six NC.701s (received from LOT airlines) from 1949 to 1955 for aerial photography

Slovak Air Force (1939–45)

 Swiss Air Force 

 Soviet Air Force operated several captured Si 204.

Civil operators

 ČSA operated post-war built Aero C-103s.

 Deutsche Luft Hansa operated at least four aircraft.

 Nationaal Luchtvaart Laboratorium (NLL) (NLL Dutch National Aeronautical Laboratory) operated one Si 204D-1 (BMM built) from 1946 till 1964, registered PH-NLL.

 Polskie Linie Lotnicze LOT operated in 1947–1948 six NC.701 bought in France. Aircraft were used for aerial photography and had markings from SP-LFA to LFF.

 Rikets Allmänna Kartverk operated five NC.701 bought in France between 1962–1970 for mapping photography.

 Aeroflot operated post war some captured Si 204 for transport duties.

 la Compañía Auxiliar de Navegación Aérea (CANA) operated two Siebel Si-204A aircraft, as EC-ACM (previously, EC-EAS) and EC-ADB (EC-EAM), which had belonged to the German embassy in Spain.

Specifications (Si 204D)

See also

References

Notes

Bibliography

 Franzke, Manfred. Siebel Fh.104/Si.204 varianten. Ilterissen, Germany: Flugzeug Publikations GmbH, 1997
 Griehl, Manfred. The Luftwaffe Profile Series No. 11: Siebel Fh 104/Si 204 and its variants. Atglen, PA: Schiffer Publications, 1998. 
 Jońca, Adam. Samoloty linii lotniczych 1945–1956 Warszawa, Poland: WKiŁ, 1985. 
Smith, J.R. and Kay, Antony J. German Aircraft of the Second World War. London: Putnam, 1990.

External links

Siebel Si 204
Siebel 204 Walk around

1940s German airliners
Si 204
1940s German military trainer aircraft
1940s German military transport aircraft
Low-wing aircraft
Aircraft first flown in 1940
Twin piston-engined tractor aircraft